Veronika Winter (born February 2, 1965 in Limburg an der Lahn) is a German soprano. She is particularly noted for her recordings of Baroque music.

References

External links

German sopranos
1965 births
Living people
People from Limburg an der Lahn
21st-century German women singers